was a stable of sumo wrestlers, part of the Takasago group of stables. It was founded in February 1986 by the Hawaiian born Takamiyama of the Takasago stable in Higashi–Komagata, Sumida, Tokyo. It was the first stable ever to be run by a foreign-born coach. Azumazeki's first sekitori was Akebono, also from Hawaii, in 1990, who subsequently reached the yokozuna rank. A total of nine foreign born wrestlers have fought for the stable: seven from the United States, one from Great Britain and one (Kosei) from China who retired in January 2017. The stable's first Japanese sekitori was Takamisakari. As of January 2021 it had seven wrestlers.

The former Takamiyama reached the mandatory retirement age of 65 in June 2009 and was succeeded by Ushiomaru who announced his retirement from active competition after the May tournament. In 2012 it absorbed Nakamura stable when Takamiyama's former stablemate Fujizakura retired as a coach upon turning 65.

In February 2018 the stable moved from Sumida to larger premises in Shibamata District, Katsushika. The opening was celebrated at the Ryōgoku Kokugikan with around 500 guests from the sumo world. The move was encouraged by the Katsushika ward, to help increase tourism.

Azumazeki-oyakata died in December 2019 at the age of 41, and after the January 2020 tournament the former Takamisakari took over as Azumazeki-oyakata. However, this was on a provisional basis for one year only, and the Sumo Association announced the closure of the stable on April 1, 2021 due to no permanent successor to Ushiomaru being found, with the personnel moving to Hakkaku stable.
 
The stable's premises were briefly used by Futagoyama stable. The original building used prior to 2018 still exists and was used for Kaonishiki's retirement ceremony in May 2021. Since 2022, the old Sumida building is home to the Miyagino stable.

Ring name conventions
Some wrestlers at this stable took ring names or shikona that begin with the characters 高見 (read: takami), meaning high and view, in deference to the coach and owner, the former Takamiyama. Examples include Takamisato and Takamiryū.

Owner
2019–2021: 14th Azumazeki Daigorō (iin, former komusubi Takamisakari)
2009–2019: 13th Azumazeki Daigorō (former maegashira Ushiomaru)
1986–2009: 12th Azumazeki Daigorō (former sekiwake Takamiyama)

Notable active wrestlers

 (best rank jūryō)

Notable former members
Akebono (the 64th yokozuna)
Takamisakari (former komusubi)
Ushiomaru (former maegashira)
Takamishū (former makushita)
Daiki (former jūryō)
Hidenokuni (former jonidan)

Referee
Kimura Yōnosuke (makuuchi gyōji, real name Masashi Okuno)

Usher
Daikichi (makuuchi yobidashi, real name Yūji Ōba)

Hairdressers
Tokokei (third class tokoyama)

Location and Access
2018–2021: 2-10-13 Shibamata, Katsushika Ward, Tokyo Prefecture 125-0052
1986–2018: Tokyo, Sumida Ward, Higashi Komagata 4-6-4
3 minute walk from Honjo-Azumabashi Station on Toei Asakusa Line

Contact Information
Phone number: 03-5876-5713

Fax number: 03-5876-5714

Email: tokyo@azumazeki.jp

See also 
List of sumo stables
List of active sumo wrestlers
List of past sumo wrestlers
Glossary of sumo terms

References

External links 
Official site 
Japan Sumo Association profile
Article on Azumazeki stable

Defunct sumo stables